Lenin in October is a 1937 Soviet biographical drama film directed by Mikhail Romm and Dmitri Vasilyev and starring Boris Shchukin, Nikolay Okhlopkov and Vasili Vanin. Made as a Soviet-realist propaganda work by the GOSKINO at the Mosfilm studio, it portrays the activities of Lenin at the time of the October Revolution. All Stalin scenes were expunged from the film for its reissue in 1958.

The movie was followed by Lenin in 1918, which was made two years later.

Cast
 Boris Shchukin as Vladimir Lenin
 Nikolay Okhlopkov as Vasily, bolshevik and Lenin's bodyguard  
 Vasili Vanin as Matveyev, bolshevik
 Vladimir Pokrovsky as Felix Dzerzhinsky
Nikolai Arsky as Blinov, worker
Yelena Shatrova as Anna Mikhailovna
Klavdiya Korobova as Natasha, Vasily's wife
 Nikolai Svobodin as Valerian Rutkovsky, the Social Revolutionary
 Viktor Ganshin as Zhukov, the Menshevik
Vladimir Vladislavsky as Karnaukhov
Aleksandr Kovalevsky as Alexander Kerensky
Nikolai Sokolov as Mikhail Rodzianko
Nikolai Chaplygin as Kirilin
 Ivan Lagutin as Filimonov
 Semyon Goldshtab as Joseph Stalin (in the first version of movie)
Sergei Tsenin as Pavel Malyantovich (uncredited)
 Anatoli Papanov as worker (uncredited)

Production 
Stalin wanted a film that showed the October Revolution and the men responsible for it, just in time for its twentieth anniversary. As soon as Alexei Kapler's scenario was approved by the highest authorities, Lenin in October was put into production on August 10th, already late in the year. The only director available was Mikhail Romm. Lenin in October was ready for release on November 7th, only three months after the shooting commenced.

References

Bibliography 
 Rollberg, Peter. Historical Dictionary of Russian and Soviet Cinema. Scarecrow Press, 2008.

External links 
 

1937 drama films
1937 films
1930s biographical drama films
1930s Russian-language films
Russian Revolution films
Films about Vladimir Lenin
Cultural depictions of Joseph Stalin
Films directed by Mikhail Romm
Films directed by Dmitri Vasilyev
Films set in 1917
Russian biographical drama films
Russian black-and-white films
Soviet biographical drama films
Soviet black-and-white films
Soviet revolutionary propaganda films
Mosfilm films